Gorazan (also Romanized as Gorāzān; also known as Gorāzū) is a village in Afin Rural District, Zohan District, Zirkuh County, South Khorasan Province, Iran. In 2006, its population was 170, in 46 families.

References 

Populated places in Zirkuh County